The Pointe-Claire Yacht Club is a yacht club in Pointe-Claire, Quebec, Canada. It is an important historical establishment that has been a part of the Pointe-Claire community for more than 130 years.

History
The Early Years
The Pointe-Claire Yacht Club was begun in 1879 when a group of boating enthusiastic came together and decided to form the Pointe-Claire boating club. They were able to lease part of the old railway pier from the Grand Trunk Railway that was no longer being used to ship limestone. The first years of the club were productive ones that were mainly spent constructing their own clubhouse and establishing themselves in the area.  By 1890 they were able to host their first annual regatta with its 39 members.

In the beginning of the Pointe-Claire Boating Club the main focus was on paddling, not sailing. Some members of the boating club felt that sailing was being neglected and in 1892, they broke away from the Pointe-Claire Boating Club to form their own club for sailing, the Corinthian Sailing Club.  The Corinthian Club was interested in promoting sailing races, to establish uniform rules for the Government of all Races, and to encourage building and sailing yachts. As an overall interest in sailing increased within Pointe-Claire the sailing club eventually merged back with the Pointe-Claire Boating Club, allowing their old club house to become a storage area.

Library and Archives Canada has the Frederick A. Dawson collection of images of the Pointe Claire Yacht Club 1882-1989 

The War Years
By 1913 the Pointe-Claire Boating Club was large enough to host the Eastern Division Regatta of the Canadian Canoe Association for the first time. The fact that the Boating club was able to reach such a size managed to help it survive through World War I. When the summer of 1914 arrived the club suffered a substantial decrease in members due to the war. They were forced to abandon expansion plans that they had and simply focus on keeping the club open by holding fundraisers. When the end of war finally came many returned to the club enthusiastically looking to improve the club and as well as community life. They were able to finally persuade the Grand Trunk Railway to sell them the east side of the pier, and renamed themselves the Pointe-Claire Yacht Club.
The same threat of closure was faced in World War II by the club when many of the members went off to war or simply did not have the leisure to be a part of a yacht club anymore, but the Pointe-Claire Yacht Club prevailed once again. While other such boating clubs like the Valois Boating Club and the Lakeside Boating club went under, the Pointe-Claire Yacht Club was able to survive and undergo expansion after the war.

The Pointe Claire Yacht Club has had to go through many trials over the years but has always managed to come out on top. It has now established itself as an important landmark of Pointe-Claire as well as a vital part of the Pointe-Claire community.

References

Bibliography
 Howett, David M. "Pointe Claire yacht club" Montreal: School of Architecture, McGill University
1979
 Martin, Helen. "1879-1979 Pointe Claire Yacht Club Centennial". Wanganui: Perry Printing Limited, 1979.
 Matthews, Brian R. "A History of Pointe Claire". Pointe Clair: Brianor Ltd., 1985.

External links

Pointe-Claire
Yacht clubs in Canada
1879 establishments in Quebec